Quendon is a linear village and former civil parish, now in the parish of Quendon and Rickling, in the Uttlesford district, in the county of Essex, England. The trunk road status was lost due to the opening of the parallel M11 motorway. In 1931 the parish had a population of 156.

History

The name of Quendon derives from the Old English cwena (queen, or woman) and denu (a valley), meaning the valley owned by a queen, or a woman; the queen referred to may be Ricula, wife of King Sledd of Essex, who gave her name to Rickling, the adjacent parish. The history of Quendon is closely associated with its close neighbour, Rickling village.

Quendon is mentioned in the Domesday Book, with 10 households populated by 3 villagers, 4 smallholders and 3 slaves.

Historically these two villages were separated by some distance, but it is thought that either due to the heavy loss of life during the 14th Century by the Black Death or a significant fire in the old wooden buildings of the day, caused much of the village to relocate its current position. The original Rickling village was closely sited near its own, now isolated All Saints' parish church, approximately 1.5 km away.

Today, the villages nestle together and the boundary is almost unnoticeable. Despite the close geographic tie between these two neighbours, the parishes were distinct until the late 20th century.  The historic "Coffin Path" bridleway was used for the parish residents of Rickling to travel to its own church some distance over the fields. In 1520, it had become the property of Thomas Newman, who built the Hall, which was re-built in the 17th century by John Turner, Esq., who enclosed the park. It was sold during the last century to Henry Cranmer, from whom it descended to James Powell Cranmer.

The Church is a small tiled building, and the rectory, valued in K. B. at £9, and in 1831 at £165, is in the patronage of Mrs Cranmer, and incumbency of the Rev. John Collin, sen., M.A., who has a good residence, and 53A. of glebe. The tithes were commuted in 1839 for £150 per annum.                                

The first mention of a postal service in Quendon was in 1793 and the village had a Penny Post service from 1813. The village post office closed in February 2008.

On 1 April 1949 the parish was abolished and merged with Ricking to form "Quendon and Rickling".

Notable residents
The diarist and writer William Winstanley lived in the village in the 17th century, in a Tudor farmhouse called Berries. Under the pseudonym Poor Robin Goodfellow, he wrote about the joys of celebrating Christmas. This helped to restore the custom of such celebrations after a period when they had been banned by the Puritans.

Also, Henry Winstanley famous for the design of the first Eddystone Lighthouse, and the Pamphilon family, of which several members were noted violin makers, were thought to be residents.

The astronomer Fred Hoyle lived in the village for 10 years just after the Second World War, Quendon being the closest to Cambridge he could afford to live at first. He left to live in Cambridge in late 1957, the same year he was elected a fellow of the Royal Society.

Roger Whittaker, the Kenyan-born English singer/songwriter and musician lived in the parish for a while, having bought Rickling House.

See also
 The Hundred Parishes

References

Villages in Essex
Former civil parishes in Essex
Uttlesford